Crackin' Up! was Ray Stevens' twenty-fourth studio album and his fourth for MCA Records, released in 1987. Three singles were lifted from the album: "Would Jesus Wear a Rolex", "Three-Legged Man" and "Sex Symbols", the last two of which did not chart.

Chuck Donkers of AllMusic rated the album four stars out of five, saying that the songs "don't just make you laugh, they make you think, too."

Track listing

Album credits 
As listed in liner notes.
 Produced and Arranged by Ray Stevens
 Recorded at Ray Stevens Studio (Nashville, Tennessee).
 Engineer – Stuart Keathley
 Mastered by Glenn Meadows at Masterfonics (Nashville, Tennessee).
 Mixed and Mastered using the JVC Digital Mastering System.
 Art Direction – Ray Stevens and Slick Lawson
 Photography – Slick Lawson
 Design Concept – Ray Stevens

Musicians
 Ray Stevens – vocals, keyboards, synthesizers
 Mark Casstevens – rhythm guitars, banjo, harmonica
 Steve Gibson – electric guitars 
 Stuart Keathley – bass 
 Tommy Wells – drums 
 Carol Chase – backing vocals 
 Lisa Silver – backing vocals 
 Diane Tidwell – backing vocals

Chart performance

Album

Singles

References

1987 albums
MCA Records albums
Ray Stevens albums